Dizel Penza is an ice hockey team in Penza, Russia. They play in the VHL, the second level of Russian ice hockey. The club used to be affiliated with Neftekhimik Nizhnekamsk of the KHL.

History
The club was founded as Burevestnik Penza in 1955. In 1963, they were renamed Dizelist Penza, and took on their current Dizel Penza name in 2002.

Notable alumni
Vladislav Bulin
Airat Kadeikin
Yan Kaminsky
Sergei Svetlov
Dmitri Vanyasov
Sergei Yashin

External links
Official site

Ice hockey teams in Russia
Ice hockey clubs established in 1955
Sport in Penza
1955 establishments in Russia